David Pierce is an American baseball coach. He is currently the head coach at The University of Texas at Austin. Pierce was named head coach of the Longhorns on June 29, 2016.

Assistant coaching history

University of Houston
Having coached at Rice in 1991 and then in the high school ranks, Pierce rejoined the collegiate coaching ranks at his alma mater, the University of Houston. As the Cougars hitting coach, he helped the team to two postseason tournaments. In 2002 – his second year as an assistant coach – Pierce helped UH reach a Super Regional. His hitters finished with almost 700 hits and a .310 team batting average, good for 5th in Cougar history.

Rice University
Pierce joined the Rice staff as a hitting coach in 2003 and was part of the school's first national championship. After the departure of Zane Curry, Pierce became the team's pitching coach and oversaw one of the most consistent pitching staffs in the nation. From 2007 to 2010, his pitchers ranked in the top 20 nationally in ERA each year. In 2007, the Owls were fourth in the country with a 3.04 ERA. His pitching staff ranked in the top 30 in staff ERA for five years as pitching coach for the Owls.

Head coaching career

Sam Houston State
Pierce was hired as Sam Houston's head coach in 2011 following former coaching legend Mark Johnson's retirement. In his first season as head coach, Pierce coached the Bearkats to their first outright conference title since 1989. In the 40-win season, the team won 13 straight games and was nationally ranked in each of the major national polls at one point in the season. In conference play, the Bearkats won a Southland record 24 games. His team earned an at-large bid to the Houston Regional, where it matched the program's best regional finish in history, defeating No. 1 seed Rice and reaching the final against Arkansas. That season, Pierce was named Southland Conference Coach of the Year and AMCA Regional Coach of the Year. In his time at Sam Houston State, Pierce's teams won the Southland Conference regular season and appeared in the NCAA Tournament every season.

Tulane
On June 8, 2014, Tulane University announced it had hired Pierce as its 23rd head baseball coach, following long-time coach Rick Jones' retirement due to health concerns. In his first year at Tulane, David Pierce brought the Green Wave back to postseason play for the first time since 2008. In 2016, he improved on that and brought Tulane its first conference championship since 2005.

Texas
Pierce was hired as the head coach of The University of Texas baseball program on June 29, 2016 to replace former head coach Augie Garrido. In 2018, Pierce led the Longhorns to the Big 12 Conference regular season title, NCAA Regional and Super Regional crowns, and the program's 36th appearance in the College World Series. Pierce was named the Big 12 Coach of the Year and Baseball America College Coach of the Year in 2018.

Head coaching record

See also
List of current NCAA Division I baseball coaches

References

External links
 Univ. of Texas profile
 Tulane bio

1962 births
Living people
High school baseball coaches in the United States
Houston Cougars baseball coaches
Houston Cougars baseball players
Rice Owls baseball coaches
Sam Houston Bearkats baseball coaches
Texas Longhorns baseball coaches
Tulane Green Wave baseball coaches
Wharton County Pioneers baseball players